Jan Willem Klop (born 1945) is a professor of applied logic at Vrije Universiteit in Amsterdam. He holds a Ph.D. in mathematical logic from Utrecht University. Klop is known for his work on the Algebra of Communicating Processes, co-author of TeReSe and his fixed point combinator

 Yk = (L L L L L L L L L L L L L L L L L L L L L L L L L L)

where

 L = λabcdefghijklmnopqstuvwxyzr. (r (t h i s i s a f i x e d p o i n t c o m b i n a t o r))

Klop became a member of the Royal Netherlands Academy of Arts and Sciences in 2003.

Selected publications

 
  — preceding technical report FVI 86-03
  — preceding technical report IEICE COMP 88-90

References

External links 
 Jan Willem Klop's homepage
 

1945 births
Living people
Dutch computer scientists
Members of the Royal Netherlands Academy of Arts and Sciences
Utrecht University alumni
Academic staff of Vrije Universiteit Amsterdam
People from Gorinchem